Verbesina rupestris is a species of flowering plant in the family Asteraceae. It is found only in Jamaica. It is threatened by habitat loss.

References

rupestris
Vulnerable plants
Endemic flora of Jamaica
Taxonomy articles created by Polbot